David Wintersgill (born 19 September 1965) is an English former footballer who played as a midfielder in the Football League for Wolverhampton Wanderers, Chester City and Darlington.

He was also on the books of Wimbledon and Bradford City without playing League football for either. He spent three seasons playing for TP-Seinäjoki in the lower divisions of Finnish football, and played non-league football in England for Gresley Rovers, Scarborough, Malvern Town, Bishop Auckland, Colne Dynamoes, and Guisborough Town.

After finishing with full-time football, he began what became a long career in the prison service.

References

1965 births
Living people
People from Northallerton
English footballers
Association football midfielders
Wolverhampton Wanderers F.C. players
Chester City F.C. players
Wimbledon F.C. players
Bradford City A.F.C. players
Gresley F.C. players
Scarborough F.C. players
Malvern Town F.C. players
Darlington F.C. players
Bishop Auckland F.C. players
Colne Dynamoes F.C. players
Guisborough Town F.C. players
English Football League players
National League (English football) players
Northern Football League players
Northern Premier League players